Pelmatosphaera is a monotypic genus of worms belonging to the monotypic family Pelmatosphaeridae. The only species is Pelmatosphaera polycirri.

References

Orthonectida
Monotypic animal genera